William Henry Haywood Tison (November 6, 1822December 4, 1882) was an American politician who served as the 39th speaker of the Mississippi House of Representatives from January 1882 until his assassination 11 months into his speakership. On December 4, 1882, J. Edward Sanders shot him on the sidewalk of Front Street in Baldwyn, Mississippi. A member of the Democratic Party, Tison represented Lee and Tishomingo counties. During the American Civil War, he served as an officer in the Confederate States Army.

See also 
 List of assassinated American politicians
 List of assassinations by firearm
 List of people from Mississippi

Notes

References

External links

 
 W. H. H. Tison at The Political Graveyard

1822 births
1882 deaths
1882 murders in the United States
19th-century American male writers
19th-century American merchants
19th-century American newspaper editors
19th-century American politicians
19th Mississippi Infantry Regiment
American Civil War prisoners of war
American Freemasons
American male non-fiction writers
American political writers
American slave owners
Assassinated American politicians
Buchanan administration personnel
Burials in Mississippi
Businesspeople from Mississippi
Confederate States Army officers
Deaths by firearm in Mississippi
Farmers from Mississippi
Journalists from Mississippi
Male murder victims
Military personnel from Mississippi
People from Jackson County, Alabama
People from Baldwyn, Mississippi
People from Tishomingo County, Mississippi
People murdered in Mississippi
People of Mississippi in the American Civil War
Speakers of the Mississippi House of Representatives
Democratic Party members of the Mississippi House of Representatives
United States Marshals